Jacek Niedźwiedzki (7 June 1951 – 27 October 2021) was a professional tennis player from Poland.

Career
A five-time doubles gold medalist in the Polish Championships, Niedźwiedzki featured in nine ties for the Poland Davis Cup team during the 1970s, for a record of 6 wins from 15 matches. His only main draw appearance in a Grand Slam tournament was at the 1975 French Open when he faced 11th seed Jaime Fillol in the first round. In a best of three set match, he pushed Fillol to a third but was unable to cause the upset. He won a Grand Prix doubles title at Barcelona in 1976. With partner Wojtek Fibak, he defeated Colin Dowdeswell and Paul Kronk in the final. In 1977 he was a losing singles finalist in the Zurich Grand Prix tournament, to Sweden's Jan Norbäck.

Grand Prix career finals

Singles: 1 (0–1)

Doubles: 1 (1–0)

Coaching
Niedźwiedzki after his playing career, ran a tennis academy in Sopot. As a coach he has worked with Johan Kriek and Sylvia Hanika. He has also been involved with the Austria Fed Cup team and coached Bahrain in the Davis Cup.

See also
List of Poland Davis Cup team representatives

References

External links
 
 
 

1951 births
2021 deaths
Polish male tennis players
Place of birth missing